In 1962, Billboard published a chart ranking the top-performing songs in the United States in rhythm and blues (R&B) and related African American-oriented music genres; it was published under the title Hot R&B Sides through the issue of the magazine dated October 27 and Hot R&B Singles thereafter.  The chart has undergone various name changes over the decades to reflect the evolution of such genres and since 2005 has been published as Hot R&B/Hip-Hop Songs.

In the issue of Billboard dated January 6, Ray Charles and his orchestra moved up to number one with "Unchain My Heart", which held the top spot for two weeks.  Charles would go on to achieve two further s later in the year, both taken from his album Modern Sounds in Country and Western Music, which is considered to have been a ground-breaking record.  His recording of Don Gibson's 1957 song "I Can't Stop Loving You" spent ten weeks at number one, the year's longest unbroken spell in the top spot.  The song was a triple , as it also reached number one on the Easy Listening chart as well as the all-genre Hot 100.  In December, Charles spent two weeks atop the chart with his version of "You Are My Sunshine", giving him a total of 14 weeks at number one, the most for any act in 1962.  The only other act with more than one number one during the year was the 4 Seasons, who topped the chart with both "Sherry" and "Big Girls Don't Cry".

Several of 1962's number ones were associated with dance crazes of the time.  In March, Sam Cooke spent three weeks atop the chart with "Twistin' the Night Away", which was followed into the top spot by "Soul Twist" by King Curtis and the Noble Knights, both of which referenced the dance the Twist.  The latter song was in turn displaced by "Mashed Potato Time" by Dee Dee Sharp, referring to the dance the Mashed Potato, and later in the year Little Eva spent three weeks at number one with "The Loco-Motion", the lyrics of which described a dance which did not actually exist at the time but which came into being following the song's success.  Almost all of the acts to reach number one in 1962 did so for the first time; of the 13 acts to top the chart during the year, only Charles, Cooke and Esther Phillips had achieved a previous R&B number one.  Phillips, then known as Little Esther, had reached number one three times in 1950 as a featured vocalist with the Johnny Otis Orchestra, but had not entered the chart at all for more than ten years when her version of "Release Me" charted in late 1962 and quickly rose to number one.

Chart history

References

Works cited

1962
1962 record charts
1962 in American music